Alfred E. Alquist (August 2, 1908 – March 27, 2006) was a California politician.

Biography
Born in 1908 in Memphis, Tennessee, the son of a Swedish immigrant who worked for the railroads, Alquist was barely a teenager when he started carrying water to railroad work crews. He became a timekeeper, switchman, brakeman and conductor, before serving with the Army Air Forces during World War II. He was a yardmaster for the Southern Pacific Railroad when he and his first wife, Mai Alquist, moved to San Jose, California in 1947.

Alquist was elected to the California State Assembly in 1962, and four years later, the State Senate, where he served for 30 years. A forceful and savvy state legislator, he chaired the powerful Senate Finance Committee for 15 years. He also routinely chaired the two-house conference committee that wrote the final version of the state budget before it went to the Assembly and Senate floors.

He was the Democratic nominee for Lieutenant Governor of California in 1970 but was defeated by incumbent Republican Lieutenant Governor Edwin Reinecke.

He was perhaps best known for his co-authorship of the landmark 1974 law, known as the Warren-Alquist Act, which created the California Energy Commission and became a national model. In the legislature, Alquist also helped to establish the Santa Clara County transit system, the state's earthquake safety programs OSHPD and Hospital Facilities Seismic Safety Act, HSSA, and the state Energy Commission. A pragmatic New Deal Democrat, he earned a reputation for helping the poor and representing the interests of labor. When term limits forced him to retire in 1996, he was the Legislature's ranking member.

Alquist died of pneumonia in Sacramento, California, in 2006.  He was 97 years old.  A state office building in downtown San Jose, which he had advocated to get built, is named for him. His second wife, Elaine Alquist, served in both the State Assembly and State Senate before and after his death, representing much of the same territory her husband had. She held his same Senate seat for two terms, from 2004 to 2012.

See also
 Hal Bernson, Los Angeles City Council member, given the Alfred E. Alquist Award for Achievement in Earthquake Safety in 1997

External links
 Alfred E. Alquist Papers at San Jose State University

References

1908 births
2006 deaths
California state senators
Democratic Party members of the California State Assembly
United States Army Air Forces personnel of World War II
Politicians from Memphis, Tennessee
Politicians from San Jose, California
United States Army Air Forces soldiers
Spouses of California politicians
Yardmasters
20th-century American politicians
Deaths from pneumonia in California